Attilio Sorbi (born 7 February 1959) is an Italian football manager and former player.

Playing career
Throughout his career he played as a midfielder for Montevarchi, Ternana, Roma, Pisa, Padova, Bologna, Venezia-Mestre, Cavese, Battipagliese and Rondinella.

Coaching career
On 23 July 2019, Sorbi was appointed head coach of Inter Women.

References

1959 births
Living people
Ternana Calcio players
A.S. Roma players
Pisa S.C. players
Calcio Padova players
Bologna F.C. 1909 players
Venezia F.C. players
People from Cortona
Association football midfielders
Italian footballers
Inter Milan (women) managers
Serie A (women's football) managers
Footballers from Tuscany
Sportspeople from the Province of Arezzo